Rock Hard Festival is a heavy metal festival organized and sponsored by the Rock Hard magazine. First established in Lichtenfels, Bavaria, Germany, in 1990 on an irregular basis, mostly for magazine anniversaries, it is held annually in Gelsenkirchen, since 2003. Its 2016 edition was taken place on 13–15 May 2016.

The 2003 festival was also initially planned for the 20th anniversary of the magazine as a single event. But the fans voted it as the best metal open-air in Germany and so they continued. The festival is still held at the amphitheater which is located directly at the Rhein-Herne-Kanal in the Nordsternpark in Gelsenkirchen. The amphitheater has a maximum capacity of 7,000 people. The festival was the only festival with international metal bands in the Ruhrgebiet area until the Rock am Ring offshoot Rock im Revier, which was organized by the Nürburgring operating company Deutsche Entertainment AG (DEAG), took place in Gelsenkirchen in 2015. Kreator canceled the show at Rock im Revier for their headlining appearance at the smaller Rock Hard Festival.

Lineups

2016

2015

2014

2013

2012

2011

2010

2009

2008

2007

External links
Official website

References

2003 establishments in Germany
Heavy metal festivals in Germany
Culture of North Rhine-Westphalia
Gelsenkirchen